The Yes Men is a 2003 documentary film about the early culture jamming exploits of The Yes Men.

The film revolves around "The Yes Men" — two anti-globalization activists, under the aliases Andy Bichlbaum and Mike Bonanno — who impersonate spokespeople for the WTO and affiliated corporations in order to secretly lampoon and satirize these organizations with elaborate ruses and fraudulent announcements of ridiculous corporate decisions, in front of live, unsuspecting audiences (usually comprising businesspeople, university student bodies, and the press). The film details the two activists' involvement in hoaxes targeting SimCopter, the 2000 G. W. Bush presidential campaign, McDonald's, and, most prominently, the WTO. The film also includes brief interviews with Michael Moore and Greg Palast.

The film premiered at the 28th Toronto International Film Festival in 2003. It was also shown as part of a special screening at the 2004 Sundance Film Festival. The film received generally positive reviews from critics. It is followed by a sequel, The Yes Men Fix the World.

Reception
On Rotten Tomatoes the film has an approval rating of 85% based on reviews from 84 critics. On Metacritic the film has a score of 68% based on reviews from 26 critics, indicating "generally favorable reviews".

Peter Travers of Rolling Stone gave it 3 out of 4 and called the film "Subversive and diabolically funny."
Roger Ebert of the Chicago Sun-Times gave it 3 out of 4, and wrote: "Amazing in what it shows, but underwhelming in what it does with it."

References

External links
 The Yes Men website
 

2003 comedy films
2004 documentary films
2004 films
2003 films
American business films
Anti-modernist films
Documentary films about business
The Yes Men
United Artists films
Films about activists
Films directed by Chris Smith
Anti-corporate activism
2000s English-language films
2000s American films
English-language documentary films

fr:The Yes Men